The National Cyber Security Hall of Fame, founded by Larry Letow and Rick Geritz, was established in 2012 to recognize the contributions of key individuals in the field of cyber security; its mission statement is, Respect the Past - Protect the Future. According to its website, it is designed to honor the innovative individuals and organizations which had the vision and leadership to create the fundamental building blocks for the cyber security Industry.  The organization also highlights major milestones in the industry's 40-year history through a timeline representation, which includes inductees and their corresponding accomplishments.

Nominations
Nominations into the Cyber Security Hall of Fame are submitted in the following categories, then reviewed by the Advisory Committee, chaired in 2013 by Mike Jacobs.
Technology
Policy
Public Awareness
Education
Business

Founders
Mr. Larry Letow, Operations Partner for Interprise Partners, and Rick Gertiz, CEO of SwingAI

Advisory board
As of 2019 the members of the Cyber Security Hall of Fame advisory board are:

Mike Jacobs - Chairman of the National Cyber Security Hall of Fame
Jim Bidzos - Chief Executive Officer and Chairman of VeriSign, Inc.
Donna F. Dodson - Chief Cyber Security Advisor for the National Institute of Standards and Technology
Cynthia E. Irvine - Distinguished Professor of Computer Science at the Naval Postgraduate School
Charles Kolodgy - Senior Security Strategist for IBM
Gordon W. Romney - Professor of Cyber Security at the University of San Diego
John Serafini - venture capital investor
Eugene H. Spafford - Professor of Computer Science at Purdue University

Hall of Fame Class of 2012
F. Lynn McNulty - an early champion of information security in the U.S. Government
Martin Hellman - Professor Emeritus at Stanford University
Ralph Merkle - developed earliest public key cryptography system with Diffie and Hellman
Whitfield Diffie - developed the world's earliest public key cryptographic system along with Merkle and Hellman
Dorothy Denning - one of the world's leading experts in information security
Roger R. Schell - President of ESec, providing platforms for secure e-business on the Internet
Peter G. Neumann - Principal Scientist at SRI International 
Carl Landwehr - Lead Research Scientist at the Cyber Security and Policy Institute of George Washington University
Ronald Rivest - Professor of Computer Science at MIT's EECS Department
Adi Shamir - Professor of Mathematics and Computer Science at the Weizmann Institute
Leonard Adleman - Professor of Computer Science and Molecular Biology at the University of Southern California

Hall of Fame Class of 2013

David Elliott Bell- coauthor of the Bell-LaPadula model of computer security
Jim Bidzos - Chief Executive Officer and Chairman of VeriSign, Inc
Eugene H. Spafford - Professor of Computer Science at Purdue University
James P. Anderson - started the field of intrusion detection and organized the CIA group known as "The Brain Trust"
Willis H. Ware - Computer Scientist Emeritus at the RAND Corporation

Hall of Fame Class of 2014

Steven M. Bellovin - Professor of Computer Science at Columbia University
Vinton G. Cerf - Vice-President and Chief Internet Evangelist for Google
Richard A. Clarke - former Special Advisor to the President on Cyber Security
Paul Kocher - designer of SSL3 cryptographic elements
Philip Zimmermann - creator of Pretty Good Privacy (PGP)

Hall of Fame Class of 2015

Cynthia E. Irvine - Distinguished Professor of Computer Science at the Naval Postgraduate School
Susan Landau - Professor of Cyber Security and Policy at Tufts University's Fletcher School of Law and Diplomacy 
Steven B. Lipner - retired Director of Software Security at Microsoft
Ronald S. Ross - National Institute of Standards and Technology Fellow
Jerome H. Saltzer - Professor Emeritus of Computer Science at MIT

Hall of Fame Class of 2016

Horst Feistel - inventor of the Data Encryption Standard
Dan Geer - Chief Information Security Officer at In-Q-Tel
Lance J. Hoffman - Distinguished Research Professor of Computer Science at George Washington University
Paul A. Karger - inventor and security architect at the Digital Equipment Corporation and at IBM
Butler Lampson - Technical Fellow at Microsoft and Adjunct Professor of Computer Science at MIT
William H. Murray - founder of the Colloquium for Information System Security Education (CISSE)
Leonard J. LaPadula - coauthor of the Bell-LaPadula model of computer security

Hall of Fame Class of 2019

(There was no Class of Inductees in 2017 or 2018.)
Brian Snow - retired Technical Director of Research in the NSA's Information Assurance Directorate 
Sheila Brand - main author of the Trusted Computer System Evaluation Criteria
Corey Schou - Professor of Informatics at Idaho State University and Director of its Information Assurance Training and Education Center
Virgil D. Gligor - Professor of Electrical and Computer Engineering at Carnegie Mellon University
Kenneth Minihan - former Director of the NSA and of the Defense Intelligence Agency
Rebecca Bace - pioneer in the field of intrusion detection, worked for the NSA and later in the high tech private sector
Howard Schmidt - created the first U.S. government computer forensics lab, served as White House cybersecurity adviser in the Bush and Obama Administrations

See also

 List of computer-related awards
 Information Systems Security Association International Hall Of Fame

External links
 http://www.cybersecurityhalloffame.org
 http://www.csoonline.com/article/739334/class-of-2013-inductees-for-national-cyber-security-hall-of-fame-chosen
 http://www.prnewswire.com/news-releases/first-inductees-to-national-cyber-security-hall-of-fame-unveiled-170003536.html
 http://www.infosecurity-magazine.com/view/28279/cyber-security-hall-of-fame-to-induct-11-security-pioneers
 http://www.cybermaryland.org/2012/03/national-cyber-security-hall-of-fame-to-launch-at-rsa-2012/
 https://www.rand.org/blog/2013/10/willis-ware-inducted-into-the-national-cyber-security.html
 http://www.federalnewsradio.com/241/3025860/National-Cyber-Security-Hall-of-Fame-names-first-dozen-nominees
 http://fedscoop.com/national-security-hall-of-fame-inducts-inaugural-class/
 http://www.businesswire.com/news/home/20120906006906/en/National-Cyber-Security-Hall-Fame-releases-Final#.UsHzmJHTeuk
 http://www.insideindianabusiness.com/newsitem.asp?ID=61367
 http://www.prweb.com/releases/cyber/security/prweb9966257.htm
 http://www.gsnmagazine.com/article/27362/new_national_cyber_security_hall_fame_names_first_

Awards established in 2012
Computer security organizations
Science and technology halls of fame
Computer-related awards
Halls of fame in Maryland